The Archdiocese of Saint Paul and Minneapolis is a Latin Church ecclesiastical jurisdiction or diocese of the Catholic Church in the United States. It is led by an archbishop who administers the archdiocese from the cities of Saint Paul and Minneapolis. The archbishop has both a cathedral and co-cathedral: the mother church, the Cathedral of Saint Paul in  Saint Paul, and the co-cathedral, the Basilica of Saint Mary in Minneapolis.

The archdiocese has 188 parish churches in twelve counties of Minnesota. It counts in its membership an approximate total of 750,000 people. It has two seminaries, the Saint Paul Seminary and Saint John Vianney College Seminary. Its official newspaper is The Catholic Spirit.

History

In 1680, a waterfall on the Upper Mississippi River was noted observed in a journal by Father Louis Hennepin, a Belgian Franciscan Recollect and explorer. Hennepin named them the Chutes de Saint-Antoine or the Falls of Saint Anthony after his patron saint, Anthony of Padua.

In 1727 René Boucher de La Perrière and Michel Guignas built Fort Beauharnois on the shore of Lake Pepin. It was the site of the first Roman Catholic chapel in Minnesota, which was dedicated to St. Michael the Archangel. Eventually it was abandoned as the French sent most of their troops to the east to fight the British in the French and Indian War.

Some French-speaking colonists from Switzerland, having migrated from their original settlements near Fort Garry in Canada to a place seven or eight miles below Saint Anthony Falls, Bishop Loras of Dubuque, whose diocese included the entire region now called Minnesota, visited Fort Snelling and the nearby Swiss settlement in 1839, which was called Saint Pierre. In the following year he sent a missionary to Minnesota, Father Lucien Galtier. Galtier learned that a number of settlers, who had left the Red River Colony, had settled on the east bank of the Mississippi River.  He decided that the area with the settlers was a better location for a church as it was near a steamboat landing, which had the potential for later development. Two French settlers offered a location for a church, and other settlers provided materials and labor to build a log chapel. Father Galtier wrote, "I had previously to this time fixed my residence at Saint Peter's and as the name of Paul is generally connected with that of Peter... I called it Saint Paul." With the gradual increase of population about the chapel, the community developed into a village known as Saint Paul's Landing.

The original see was canonically erected by Pope Pius IX on July 19, 1850 as the Diocese of Saint Paul of Minnesota, a suffragan episcopal see of the Archdiocese of Saint Louis. The diocese's territory was taken from that of Dubuque, and its authority spread over all of Minnesota Territory, which consisted of the area which now composes the states of Minnesota, North Dakota and South Dakota and also comprises the modern archdiocese's ecclesiastical province. Its first ordinary was Bishop Joseph Crétin. In addition to the French Canadians large contingents of Irish and German Catholics arrived, who located in St. Paul, and in places along the Mississippi, St. Croix, and Minnesota Rivers. In November 1851, the Sisters of St. Joseph of Carondelet came to St. Paul, and soon opened schools at St. Paul and St. Anthony Falls.

In January 1859, Thomas Grace was named Bishop of St. Paul. The number of Catholics in the diocese continued to grow, with many coming from Bohemia and Poland. The number of priests grew with the increase of the people, and they were so chosen as to correspond to the needs of the parishes. Hospitals were opened at Minneapolis and New Ulm, orphan asylums were erected at St. Paul and Minneapolis, and homes were established for the aged poor. In February 1875, St. Paul was transferred from the ecclesiastical province of St. Louis to that of Milwaukee.

John Ireland 

John Ireland was born in Burnchurch, County Kilkenny, Ireland. During the Civil War he served as chaplain to the Fifth Minnesota Regiment. He was appointed coadjutor to Bishop Grace, whom he succeeded in 1884. Pope Leo XIII elevated the see to the rank of archdiocese on May 4, 1888 and its name was changed to reflect this. The creation of the Diocese of Winona diminished the territory of the archdiocese by the southern section of Minnesota.

Disturbed by reports that Catholic immigrants in eastern cities were suffering from social and economic handicaps, Ireland and Bishop John Lancaster Spalding of the Diocese of Peoria, Illinois, founded the Irish Catholic Colonization Association. This organization bought land in rural areas to the west and south and helped resettle Irish Catholics from the urban slums. Various settlements such as De Graff, Clontarf (Swift Co.), Adrian (Nobles Co.), Avoca, Fulda (Murry Co.), Graceville (Big Stone Co.), Minneota, and Ghent (Lyon Co.), owe their origin and prosperity to his labours.

Charlotte Grace O'Brien, philanthropist and activist for the protection of female emigrants, found that often the illiterate young women were being tricked into prostitution through spurious offers of employment. She proposed an information bureau at Castle Garden, a temporary shelter to provide accommodation for immigrants, and a chapel, all to Archbishop Ireland, who she believed of all the American hierarchy, would be most sympathetic. Archbishop Ireland agreed to raise the matter at the May 1883 meeting of the Irish Catholic Association which endorsed the plan and voted to establish an information bureau at Castle Garden, the disembarkation point for immigrants arriving in New York. The Irish Catholic Colonization Association was also instrumental in the establishment of the Mission of Our Lady of the Rosary for the Protection of Irish Immigrant Girls.

Ireland was a strong supporter of the temperance movement, and of racial equality. On the other hand, his less than diplomatic relations with Eastern Catholics drove them into the Orthodox Church.

The author of The Church and Modern Society (1897), Ireland opposed the use of foreign languages in American Catholic churches and parochial schools. National (ethnic) parishes were common at the time because of the large influx of immigrants to the U.S. from European countries. In this, he differed from Michael Corrigan, Archbishop of New York, who believed that the more quickly Catholics gave up their native languages, customs, and traditions in order to assimilate into a Protestant culture, the sooner they would forsake their religion as well. Different views on the so-called "Americanization" of the Catholic Church in the United States split the hierarchy in the 1890s.

Name Change

Pope Paul VI once again instituted a name change for the see on July 11, 1966. Reflecting the growth of the Catholic Church in the region, it became the "Archdiocese of Saint Paul and Minneapolis", the name it retains today. Archbishop John Clayton Nienstedt, succeeded to the post on the retirement of his predecessor, Archbishop Harry Flynn, on May 2, 2008. He stepped down on June 15, 2015 and Bernard Hebda was named the next Archbishop of Saint Paul and Minneapolis.

Sexual abuse cases and bankruptcy
On May 31, 2018, the Archdiocese of St Paul and Minneapolis agreed to pay victims of clergy sexual abuse a total of $210 million in settlement, which awaited court approval. By the time the settlement was issued, 91 priests who served in the Archdiocese of St Paul and Minneapolis were accused of sexually abusing 450 victims. On June 27, 2018, the archdiocese filed for reorganization in order to find enough money to pay for the settlement. Once approved, the settlement became the second largest in any Catholic bankruptcy case in United States history and largest overall for any archdiocese which was forced into bankruptcy. On September 21, 2018, survivors of clergy abuse officially concluded a month-long vote which resulted in the approval the settlement; the vote had started on August 21. The settlement was then approved by a U.S. Bankruptcy Court judge on September 25, 2018.

Fr. James Porter and Fr. Curtis Wehmeyer were two of the most notorious predator priests to serve in the Archdiocese of Saint Paul and Minneapolis. In November 2012, Wehmeyer pled guilty to 20 sex abuse and child pornography charges. In 2013, MPR News obtained a letter revealing that an archdiocesan official, the Rev. Kevin McDonough, had known of the Archdiocese of St. Paul and Minneapolis' decision in 2011 to cover up an allegation suggesting that Wehmeyer had sexually abused two brothers in his white 2006 camper. When the reported abuse took place, the camper was parked outside Blessed Sacrament Church in St. Paul, where Wehmeyer served for six years and where the mother of the boys was working as well.  In May 2015, Wehmeyer was laicized by the Vatican while serving a five year prison sentence. Though Porter, who would later be convicted in 1993 of sex abusing 28 children while serving in the Roman Catholic Diocese of Fall River in Massachusetts, was never convicted for alleged sex abuse he committed in Minnesota before he left the priesthood in 1974, he would serve four months in a Minnesota prison following a December 1992 conviction involving alleged sex abuse of his children's babysitter. The Minnesota conviction, which also came with a six month prison sentence, was overturned shortly before his 1993 Massachusetts trial and conviction.

In May 2018, Fr. John Bertrand was sentenced to 10 years probation after pleading guilty to having sexual contact with a woman at her Mendota Heights home under the guise of mass. In September 2020, a lawsuit was filed alleging that sex abuse was "allowed" to be committed by at least one priest at a Minnesota Catholic music camp managed by Twin Cities-based Catholic music composer David Haas. Haas himself has faced previous sex abuse allegations as well.

Calls for a grand jury investigation
On August 22, 2018, Jeff Anderson, the St. Paul-based attorney who investigated and sued the archdiocese, called for Minnesota Governor Mark Dayton to assemble a Grand Jury investigation similar to the one conducted in Pennsylvania. The proposed grand jury investigation would include the Archdiocese of St Paul and Minneapolis and all of its five suffragan dioceses. Archbishop Hebda, Judge Tim O'Malley, director of Ministerial Standards and Safe Environment, and Tom Abood, chairman of the Archdiocesan Financial Council and the Reorganization Task Force, issued a joint statement stating that the archdiocese "would cooperate" with a future grand jury investigation. Caroline Burns, press secretary for Governor Dayton, stated that the case was under review and that the Governor would not publicly respond until after completing this review.

Diocesan Synod

In 2019, after the bankruptcy was settled Archbishop Bernard Hebda called for an Archdiocesan Synod to set pastoral priotiries for the future of the diocese. Delayed by the Covid-19 pandemic, the synod took place in June 2022.

Bishops

This is a list of the bishops who have served the archdiocese.

Bishops of Saint Paul
 Joseph Crétin (1850–1857)
 Thomas Langdon Grace, O.P. (1859–1884)
 John Ireland (1884–1888; coadjutor bishop 1875–1884)l elevated to archbishop with elevation of diocese

Archbishops of Saint Paul
 John Ireland (1888–1918)
 Austin Dowling (1919–1930)
 John Gregory Murray (1931–1956)
 William O. Brady (1956–1961); Coadjutor Archbishop (1956)
 Leo Binz (1961–1966); title changed with title of see

Archbishops of Saint Paul and Minneapolis
 Leo Binz (see above 1966–1975)  - Leo Christopher Byrne, Coadjutor Archbishop (1967–1974); died without succeeding to see
 John Robert Roach (1975–1995)
 Harry Joseph Flynn (1995–2008); Coadjutor Archbishop (1994-1995)
 John Clayton Nienstedt (2008–2015); Coadjutor Archbishop (2007-2008)
 Bernard Hebda (2016–present)

Current auxiliary bishop
 Joseph Andrew Williams (2022-present)
 Michael Izen (Elect, 2023)

Former auxiliary bishops
 John Jeremiah Lawler (1910–1916), appointed Bishop of Lead
 James Joseph Byrne (1947–1956), appointed Bishop of Boise and later Archbishop of Dubuque
 Leonard Philip Cowley (1957–1973)
 Gerald Francis O'Keefe (1961–1966), appointed Bishop of Davenport
 James P. Shannon (1965–1968)
 John Robert Roach (1971–1975), appointed Archbishop of Saint Paul and Minneapolis
 Raymond Alphonse Lucker (1971–1975), appointed Bishop of New Ulm
 Paul Vincent Dudley (1976–1978), appointed Bishop of Sioux Falls 
 John Francis Kinney (1976–1982), appointed Bishop of Bismarck and later Bishop of Saint Cloud
 William Henry Bullock (1980–1987), appointed Bishop of Des Moines and later Bishop of Madison
 James Richard Ham, M.M. (1980–1990)
 Robert J. Carlson (1984–1994), appointed Coadjutor Bishop of Sioux Falls and later Bishop of Sioux Falls, Bishop of Saginaw, and Archbishop of St. Louis
 Joseph Charron, C.PP.S. (1990–1994), appointed Bishop of Des Moines
 Lawrence Welsh (1991–1999)
 Frederick F. Campbell (1999–2004), appointed Bishop of Columbus
 Richard Pates (2000–2008), appointed Bishop of Des Moines
 Lee A. Piché (2009–2015), resigned
 Andrew H. Cozzens (2013–2021), appointed Bishop of Crookston

Other priests of the diocese who became bishops

John Loughlin, appointed Bishop of Brooklyn in 1853
Louis Joseph Mary Theodore de Goesbriand, appointed Bishop of Burlington in 1853
James McGolrick, appointed Bishop of Duluth in 1889
 Patrick Delany, appointed Coadjutor Archbishop of Hobart, Australia in 1893
Thomas O'Gorman, appointed Bishop of Sioux Falls in 1896
James Trobec, appointed Bishop of Saint Cloud in 1897
Alexander Christie, appointed Bishop of Vancouver Island in 1898
James John Keane, appointed Bishop of Cheyenne in 1902
John Stariha, appointed Bishop of Lead in 1902
Joseph Francis Busch, appointed Bishop of Lead in 1910
Timothy J. Corbett, appointed Bishop of Crookston in 1910
Patrick Richard Heffron, appointed Bishop of Winona in 1910
James Albert Duffy, appointed Bishop of Kearney in 1913
Thomas Anthony Welch, appointed Bishop of Duluth in 1925
James Louis Connolly, appointed Coadjutor Bishop of Fall River in 1945
Francis Joseph Schenk, appointed Bishop of Crookston in 1945
Alphonse James Schladweiler, appointed Bishop of New Ulm in 1957
Nicolas Eugene Walsh, appointed Bishop of Yakima in 1974
Peter Forsyth Christensen, appointed Bishop of Superior in 2007
John Marvin LeVoir, appointed Bishop of New Ulm in 2008
Paul David Sirba, appointed Bishop of Duluth in 2009
Donald Edward DeGrood, appointed Bishop of Sioux Falls in 2019

High schools

 Academy of Holy Angels, Richfield
 Benilde-St. Margaret's, St. Louis Park
 Bethlehem Academy, Faribault
 Visitation School, Mendota Heights
 Cretin-Derham Hall, St. Paul
 Cristo Rey Jesuit High School, Minneapolis
 DeLaSalle High School, Minneapolis
 Hill-Murray School, Maplewood
 Holy Family Catholic High School, Victoria
 Providence Academy, Plymouth
 Saint Agnes School, St. Paul
 Saint Thomas Academy, Mendota Heights
 Totino-Grace High School, Fridley

Independent Catholic schools
 Chesterton Academy, Hopkins
 Holy Spirit Academy, Monticello

Ecclesiastical Province of St. Paul and Minneapolis

Minnesota
 Archdiocese of Saint Paul and Minneapolis (Metropolitan See)
 Diocese of Crookston
 Diocese of Duluth
 Diocese of New Ulm
 Diocese of Saint Cloud
 Diocese of Winona–Rochester

North Dakota
 Diocese of Bismarck
 Diocese of Fargo

South Dakota
 Diocese of Rapid City
 Diocese of Sioux Falls

Seminaries

The Archdiocese has two seminaries, Saint John Vianney College Seminary and the Saint Paul Seminary (both located on the campus of the University of St. Thomas). From 1923-1971, it operated a high school seminary, Nazareth Hall Preparatory Seminary.

While the majority of archdiocesan seminarians receive their formation at one of the above, some are also sent to Immaculate Heart of Mary Seminary in the suffragan see of Winona-Rochester and the Pontifical North American College in Rome.

Notable parishes
Cathedral of Saint Paul, Saint Paul, mother church of the Archdiocese of Saint Paul and Minneapolis
Basilica of Saint Mary, Minneapolis, first American basilica
Our Lady of Lourdes Catholic Church, Minneapolis, oldest church building in continuous use in Minneapolis
Saint Peter's Church, Mendota, oldest active parish

See also

 Catholic Church and politics in the United States
 Catholic Church by country
 Catholic Church in the United States
 Ecclesiastical Province of Saint Paul and Minneapolis
 Father H. Timothy Vakoc (a priest of the archdiocese and an Army chaplain, who died from wounds received in the Iraq War)
 Global organisation of the Catholic Church
 History of the Catholic Church in the United States
 List of Catholic archdioceses (by country and continent)
 List of Roman Catholic dioceses (alphabetical) (including archdioceses)
 List of Roman Catholic dioceses (structured view) (including archdioceses)
 List of the Catholic bishops of the United States
 List of the Catholic cathedrals of the United States
 List of the Catholic dioceses of the United States
 Plenary Councils of Baltimore
 Roman Catholicism in the United States

Notes

External links
Official website
Cathedral of Saint Paul
The Catholic Spirit, the archdiocese's official newspaper
Information and population statistics kept by catholic-hierarchy.org (unofficial)]

 
Saint Paul and Minneapolis
Archdiocese of Saint Paul and Minneapolis
 
Religious organizations established in 1850
Saint Paul and Minneapolis
1850 establishments in Minnesota Territory
Companies that filed for Chapter 11 bankruptcy in 2015